Corneliu Papură (born 5 September 1973) is a Romanian professional football manager and former football player. He played as a centre back or a defensive midfielder.

Club career
Papură was born in Craiova, and started his career with his hometown team FC Universitatea Craiova, in 1991. As a player, he played for Universitatea in four different periods, spending a large part of his career with the club, with short stints in France, Israel and Cyprus.

International career
Papură earned 12 caps for the Romania national team, and was in the squad for the 1994 World Cup.

Honours

Player
FC U Craiova 1948
 Cupa României: 1992–93

References

External links
 
 

Fotbal Club Sportiv Becali 2021

1973 births
Living people
Sportspeople from Craiova
Romanian footballers
Romanian expatriate footballers
FC U Craiova 1948 players
Stade Rennais F.C. players
Romania international footballers
AEL Limassol players
Beitar Jerusalem F.C. players
FC Progresul București players
Expatriate footballers in France
Expatriate footballers in Cyprus
Expatriate footballers in Israel
Expatriate footballers in China
1994 FIFA World Cup players
Liga I players
Cypriot First Division players
Ligue 1 players
China League One players
Changchun Yatai F.C. players
Guangzhou F.C. players
Romanian expatriate sportspeople in China
Romanian expatriate sportspeople in Cyprus
Association football defenders
Israeli Premier League players
Romanian football managers
FC Progresul București managers
CS Universitatea Craiova managers